Tabebuia cassinoides (Portuguese common name caixeta) is a tree native to Central and South America. It is used as a timber tree to make pencils.

References

cassinoides
Flora of Central America
Flora of South America
Flora of the Atlantic Forest
Trees of Brazil
Vulnerable flora of South America
Plants described in 1845
Taxa named by Augustin Pyramus de Candolle